Gottfried Vopelius (28 January 1645 – 3 February 1715), was a German Lutheran academic and hymn-writer, mainly active in Leipzig. He was born in Herwigsdorf, now a district of Rosenbach, Oberlausitz, and died in Leipzig at the age of 70.

Neu Leipziger Gesangbuch

Vopelius is primarily remembered for the Neu Leipziger Gesangbuch (New Leipzig Hymnal) which he published in 1682. The subtitle of the publication reads: 
Or, translated:

The Neu Leipziger Gesangbuch is, to a certain degree, a third edition of Johann Schein's , which originally had been published in 1627, with a new edition in 1645. Over 90 settings in the Neu Leipziger Gesangbuch were copied or adapted from Schein. All other composers are represented with less than 10 settings in the hymnal. Of these, only Johann Crüger and Andreas Hammerschmidt are mentioned for more than three settings.

Reception
The Neu Leipziger Gesangbuch was one of the last important hymnals in the Kantional format (i.e. printed with music, including part-songs): congregational singing was generally becoming monodic, with an instrumental accompaniment, for which hymnals with only texts became the new standard.

In his Leipzig time (1723–1750), Johann Sebastian Bach used the Neu Leipziger Gesangbuch as a reference work for many of his sacred compositions. For the closing chorales of his cantatas BWV 27 and BWV 43 he used the harmonisation as found in the hymnal. For other chorale settings, such as BWV 281, he stayed close to the harmonisation published by Vopelius.

Later editions of the Leipziger Gesangbuch
In 1693 Vopelius published the Leipziger Gesangbuch, which he describes as a republication of the Neu Leipziger Gesangbuch, however without the chorale settings, but with more hymns, and enriched with engravings. The next edition appeared in 1707. Later editions of the Leipziger Gesangbuch, in 1729, 1733 and 1752, further enlarged the number of hymns, to 852, 856 and 1015 respectively, and referred to Vopelius as the former editor of the hymnal. The 1758 and 1767 editions kept the number of hymns at 1015, keeping also the referral to Vopelius as former editor on the title page.

References

External links

 
 J. S. Bach's Chorales (after hymns that appear in the) Neu Leipziger Gesangbuch at 

1645 births
1715 deaths
People from Görlitz (district)
German Lutherans
Writers from Leipzig